Old Orchard Shoal Light was a sparkplug lighthouse in lower New York Bay marking a large shoal area. It was destroyed by Hurricane Sandy on October 29, 2012.

History

Old Orchard Shoal Light was completed and lit on April 25, 1893. The Fresnel lens was removed in 1950.

Before moving on to Governor's Island and then finally Coney Island Light, Frank Schubert, said to be the last civilian lighthouse keeper in the United States, was stationed at Old Orchard Shoal Light.

Old Orchard Shoal Light is listed on the National Park Service's Maritime Heritage Program as Lighthouse to visit and as one of New York's Historic Light Stations.

On May 29, 2007, the Secretary of the Interior identified Old Orchard Shoal Light Station as surplus under the National Historic Lighthouse Preservation Act of 2000.  The property was described as

Gedney Channel/Lower New York Bay, 3.5 miles south of New Dorp Beach.  Remote 35 ft. conical, 3-story "spark plug" style light (1893) with keeper's quarters (approx. 1000 SF). Interior lined in brick up to 3rd floor. On 0.72 acre submerged land. Constructed of cast iron on concrete/cast iron caisson. Markings: white upper/black. Protective riprap and breakwater sheltering light's boat basin. Accessible by boat only.

No group was identified under the National Historic Lighthouse Preservation Act as willing and able to preserve the Old Orchard Shoal Light, and on June 5, 2008, the General Services Administration placed the light up for sale via an auction.  The initial bid was $10,000 and the light finally closed on August 27, 2008 at a final bid of $235,000.

The lighthouse was destroyed by Hurricane Sandy on October 29, 2012.

References

Lighthouses completed in 1893
Buildings and structures demolished in 2012
Lighthouses on the National Register of Historic Places in New York City
Lighthouses in Staten Island
Demolished buildings and structures in New York (state)
National Register of Historic Places in Staten Island
1893 establishments in New York (state)